WACC may refer to:

 Weighted average cost of capital
 World Amateur Chess Championship
 World Association for Christian Communication
 WACC (AM), a radio station (830 AM) licensed to Hialeah, Florida, United States
 WACC-LP, a low-power radio station (107.7 FM) licensed to Enfield, Connecticut, United States